In astrology, the line of advantage is an imaginary line that connects the third decan of the third house to the third decan of the ninth house of the horoscope.  If the North Node of the Moon falls east of the line of advantage, it is believed to be a favourable and advantageous position within the horoscope.

Astrological house systems